Andy Roddick was the defending champion, but lost in the semifinals to eventual champion Andy Murray.

Murray defeated Lleyton Hewitt 2–6, 6–1, 7–6(7–3), to become 2006 SAP Open Champion, and claim his first ever ATP Tour title.

Seeds

Draw

Finals

Top half

Bottom half

External links
Draw
Qualifying draw